The 2019 Arizona Lottery 100 was the fourteenth and final stock car race of the 2019 NASCAR K&N Pro Series West season. The race was held on Saturday, November 9, 2019, in Avondale, Arizona, at Phoenix Raceway, a  paved racetrack. The race 108 laps to complete due to a Green–white–checker finish. At race's end, Ty Gibbs took the victory in his first career NASCAR K&N Pro Series West start. To fill out the podium, Sam Mayer of GMS Racing and Derek Kraus of Bill McAnally Racing would finish second and third, respectively.

Background

Entry list

Practice

Qualifying

Full qualifying results

Race results

References 

November 2019 sports events in the United States
2019 in sports in Arizona